Erin Dorothy Simon (born August 19, 1994) is an Irish/American soccer player who plays as a defender for Women's Super League club Leicester City.

Collegiate career
Simon played college soccer for the Syracuse Orange between 2012 and 2015.

Club career

Sky Blue FC
After attending an open tryout and impressing in preseason matches, Simon was signed by Sky Blue FC in April 2016. On May 4, 2018, Simon was released by Sky Blue FC.

West Ham United
On 14 September 2018, Simon joined West Ham United ahead of the London club's debut season in the FA WSL. The campaign saw West Ham reach their first ever FA Cup final. Simon played 89 minutes as Manchester City won 3–0 at Wembley Stadium.

Houston Dash
On January 24, 2020, Simon left West Ham to return to the NWSL, signing with Houston Dash.

Racing Louisville
On November 12, 2020, Simon was selected by Racing Louisville FC in the 2020 NWSL Expansion Draft. Simon appeared in 21 matches in the 2021 season, starting 18 at fullback.

After appearing in 2 matches in the 2022 season, Racing released Simon to pursue playing opportunities outside of the NWSL.

Leicester City
On 11 July 2022, Simon signed for Women's Super League club Leicester City.

References

External links
Syracuse bio

1994 births
Living people
American women's soccer players
Syracuse Orange women's soccer players
NJ/NY Gotham FC players
West Ham United F.C. Women players
Houston Dash players
National Women's Soccer League players
People from Ocean Township, Monmouth County, New Jersey
Soccer players from New Jersey
Women's association football defenders
American expatriate women's soccer players
American expatriate sportspeople in England
Expatriate women's footballers in England
Racing Louisville FC players